Tuzla is the third-largest city of Bosnia and Herzegovina and the administrative center of Tuzla Canton of the Federation of Bosnia and Herzegovina. As of 2013, it has a population of 110,979 inhabitants.

Tuzla is the economic, cultural, educational, health and tourist centre of northeast Bosnia. It is an educational center and is home to two universities. It is also the main industrial machine and one of the leading economic strongholds of the country with a wide and varied industrial sector including an expanding service sector thanks to its salt lake tourism.

The city of Tuzla is home to Europe's only salt lake as part of its central park and has more than 350,000 people visiting its shores every year. The history of the city goes back to the 9th century; modern Tuzla dates back to 1510 when it became an important garrison town in the Ottoman Empire.

In Bosnia and Herzegovina, Tuzla is also regarded as one of the most multicultural cities in the country and has managed to keep the pluralist character of the city throughout the Bosnian War and after, with Bosniaks, Serbs, Croats and a small minority of Bosnian Jews residing in Tuzla.

Etymology
The name Tuzla is the Ottoman Turkish  word for salt mine, tuzla, and refers to the extensive salt deposits found underneath the city. Leveraging on their shared name, the city is twinned with Tuzla, a suburb of Istanbul, Turkey.

History

Early history
Archaeological evidence suggests that Tuzla was a rich Neolithic settlement. Being inhabited continuously for more than 6,000 years, Tuzla is one of the oldest European sustained settlements. During the period of the Roman Republic (before the area was conquered by Rome), Tuzla (or Salines as it was called at the time) was ruled by the Illyrian tribe Breuci.

Middle Ages to 20th century

The city was first mentioned in 950 by Constantine Porphyrogenitus in his De Administrando Imperio as a fort named Salines. The name Soli was used in the Middle Ages. It means "salts" in Bosnian and the city's present name means "place of salt" in Ottoman Turkish.
During the Middle Ages it belonged mostly to the medieval Kingdom of Bosnia.

After the fall of the kingdom to the Ottoman Empire in 1463, the region was controlled by the House of Berislavić before the Ottomans occupied the villages of "Gornje Soli" and "Donje Soli" around 1512, and took control of the entire Usora in the 1530s.

It remained under Ottoman rule for nearly 400 years, where it was administered as part of the Sanjak of Zvornik. In 1878 it was occupied by Austria-Hungary. After the dissolution of the monarchy it became the part of the newly formed Kingdom of Yugoslavia. The Husino uprising took place in 1920.

During the Second World War, Tuzla was included in the puppet Independent State of Croatia and controlled by the mainly Muslim Hadžiefendić Legion of the Croatian Home Guard.
Tuzla was among the first areas in Europe to be liberated, when Tito's Yugoslav Partisans freed it from the German occupiers on 2 October 1943. Many members of the Legion deserted to the Partisans at this time.
In December 1944, the city was unsuccessfully attacked by Chetnik forces of Draža Mihailović along with the Serbian State Guard.

After the war it developed into a major industrial and cultural centre during the Communist period in the former Yugoslavia.

Bosnian War

In the 1990 elections the Reformists won control of the municipality being the only municipality in Bosnia where non-nationalists won. During the Bosnian War of Independence between 1992 and 1995 the town was the only municipality not governed by the SDA party-led authorities. After Bosnia and Herzegovina declared independence and was recognized by the United Nations the city was besieged by Serbian forces. A few days later Serbian forces attacked Tuzla. The town was not spared the atrocities of the Bosnian War.

Early in the war, troops, of the 92nd Motorised Brigade of the Yugoslav National Army, were ambushed by units of Bosnia's Territorial Defence Force, while attempting to withdraw from the city. During the incident, an estimated 92-200 Yugoslav troops were killed, and 33 wounded. It was regarded as a war crime.

On 25 May 1995, an attack on Tuzla killed 71 people and injured 200 persons in what is referred to as the Tuzla massacre, when a shell fired from Serb's positions on the Ozren mountain (130 mm towed field gun M-46) hit the central street and its promenade. The youngest civilian who died in that massacre was only two years old.

Following the Dayton Peace Accords, Tuzla was the headquarters of the U.S. forces for the Multinational Division (MND) during Operation Joint Endeavour IFOR and subsequent SFOR.

Post-war independence

In February 2014, the city was the scene of the beginning of the 2014 unrest in Bosnia and Herzegovina, which quickly spread to dozens of cities and towns throughout Bosnia and Herzegovina. After a couple of days of calm protests, people lost patience and started burning cars in front of the canton government building, and later the building itself.

Recent years have seen economic growth as well as increases in tourism.

Geography

Tuzla is located in the northeastern part of Bosnia, settled just underneath the Majevica mountain range, on the Jala River. The central zone lies in an east–west oriented plain, with residential areas in the north and south of the city located on the Ilinčica, Kicelj and Gradina Hills. The climate is moderate continental. There are abundant coal deposits in the region around Tuzla. 6 coal mines continue to operate around the city. Much of the coal mined in the area is used to power the Tuzla Thermal Power Plant, which is the largest power plant in Bosnia and Herzegovina.

Salt deposits
Extractions of the city's salt deposits, particularly in the 20th century, have caused sections of the city center to sink. Structures in the "sinking area" either collapsed or were demolished, and there are few structures in the city that predate the 20th century, despite the fact that the city was founded over 1000 years ago. In the northeastern part of the town is an area known as Solina, named after the salt deposits.

Pannonian Lakes

Tuzla is the only city in Europe that has a salt lake in its centre. The ancient Pannonian Sea dried up around 10 million years ago, but work by researchers and scientists has now enabled a level of saline water to be kept stable at the surface, and in 2003 the Pannonian Lake was opened.

A second lake that includes artificial waterfalls was inaugurated in 2008. An archaeological park and replica Neolithic lake dwellings were also incorporated into the scheme, providing information about the different cultures which left their material and spiritual mark here. The site has become an international tourist destination.

A third lake was completed in August 2012. Construction expenses for this were nearly 2 million Bosnian marks (ca. 1 million euros). This third lake also contains 2 water slides which are an attraction for the younger population.

The summer season of 2013 recorded approximately 5,000 visitors per day (c. 450,000 for 3 months).

Climate
Tuzla has a temperate oceanic climate (Köppen climate classification Cfb) with hot summers with cool nights and cool winters with chilly nights.

Administration

Tuzla is the seat of the Tuzla Canton, which is a canton of the Federation of Bosnia and Herzegovina, as well as of Tuzla Municipality, which is one of the 13 municipalities that together constitute the Tuzla Canton. Administratively, Tuzla is divided into 39 mjesne zajednice (local districts).

Apart from Tuzla, the municipality incorporates several other adjacent settlements, including the town of Gornja Tuzla (Upper Tuzla), as well as the villages of Husino, Par Selo, Simin Han, Obodnica, Kamenjaši, Plane, Šići and others.

The current mayor of Tuzla is Zijad Lugavić, of the Social Democratic Party (SDP BiH). He succeeded long-time mayor Jasmin Imamović in 2022.

The City council of Tuzla has 30 members, of the following parties:
Independent – 12 members
Social Democratic Party (SDP BiH) – 8 members
Platform for Progress (PzP) – 2 members
Tuzla alternative – 2 members
Party of Democratic Action (SDA) – 1 member
Social Democrats (SD BiH) – 1 member
Our Party (NS) – 1 member
Croatian Democratic Union (HDZ BiH) – 1 member
Party for Bosnia and Herzegovina (SBiH) – 1 member
Movement of Democratic Action (PDA) – 1 member

Demographics
Demographics in Tuzla municipality:

1971 census
Total: 107,293
53,271 (49.65%) – Bosniaks
27,735 (25.84%) – Croats
21,089 (19.65%) – Serbs
2,540 (2.36%) – Yugoslavs
2,658 (2.47%) – others and unknown

1981 census
Total: 121,717
52,400 (43.05%) – Bosniaks
24,811 (20.38%) – Croats
20,261 (16.64%) – Serbs
19,059 (15.65%) – Yugoslavs
5,186 (4.26%) – others and unknown

1991 census
Total: 131,618

62,669 (47.61%) – Bosniaks
21,995 (16.71%) – Yugoslavs
20,398 (15.49%) – Croats
20,271 (15.40%) – Serbs
6,285 (4.77%) – others and unknown

2013 census
Total: 110,979
80,774 (72.78%) – Bosniaks
15,396 (13.87%) – Croats
3,378 (3.04%) – Serbs
11,431 (10.30%) – others and unknown
Source:

Culture

Arts

 
One of the most influential writers in the Balkans, Meša Selimović hails from Tuzla, and Tuzla hosts the annual Meša Selimović book festival in July, where an award for the best novel written in the languages of Bosnia and Herzegovina, Croatia, Serbia and Montenegro is presented.

The first professional theatre in Tuzla, the Tuzla National Theatre, was founded by the brothers Mihajlo and Živko Crnogorčević in 1898 during Austro-Hungarian rule, and is the oldest theatre in the country. The theatre is working continuously since 1944.

The Portrait Gallery has continuous exhibitions of work by local and international artists. The Ismet Mujezinović Gallery is mainly dedicated to Ismet Mujezinović, a painter from Tuzla. The Eastern Bosnia Museum exhibits archaeological, ethnological, historical and artistic pieces and artifacts from the whole region. An open-air museum at Solni Trg, opened in 2004, tells the story of salt production in Tuzla.

Religion
Apart from Tuzla's many mosques, there is also an Orthodox church that went untouched throughout the war.
The Franciscan monastery of “St. Peter and Paul” in town is still very active as there is a sizable Catholic community in Tuzla. The church of St.Francis (sv. Franjo) which had been demolished after being hit by a landslide in 1987 is being rebuilt since 2011 and should open by 2019. Just outside the town, in the nearby village of Breska, is a 200-year-old Catholic church. Tuzla is also home to an old Jewish cemetery which recently underwent renovations, organized by the OPEN Organization of Tuzla and the Jewish Municipality of Tuzla.

According to the 2013 census, most of the citizens living in Tuzla are Muslims, to be precise 75.4%, with Catholics accounting for 13.7%, while 3.3% of the population being Orthodox, 3.6% of people belong to other religions, and 3.9% of people are not religious.

Music
Bosnian roots music came from Middle Bosnia, Posavina, the Drina valley and Kalesija. It is usually performed by singers with two violinists and a šargija player. These bands first appeared around World War I and became popular in the 1960s. This is the third oldest music following after the sevdalinka and ilahija. Self-taught people, mostly in two or three members of the different choices of old instruments, mostly in the violin, sacking, saz, drums, flutes or wooden flute, as others have already called, the original performers of Bosnian music that can not be written notes, transmitted by ear from generation to generation, family is usually hereditary. It is thought to be brought from Persia-Kalesi tribe that settled in the area of present Sprecanski valleys and hence probably the name Kalesija. In this part of Bosnia it is the most common. Again, it became the leader of First World War onwards, as well as 60 years in the field Sprecanski doline. This kind of music was enjoyed by all three peoples in Bosnia, Bosniaks, Croats and Serbs, and it contributed a lot to reconcile people socializing, entertainment and other organizations through festivala. In Kalesija it's maintained each year with the Bosnian Festival Original music.

Studio Kemix firm Dzemal Dzihanovic from Živinice together with his artists brought this kind of music to perfection at the end 20th century. With its entirely new form of modernity, it is most common in the Tuzla Canton and the cradle of this music city Živinice was named Bosnian town of original music. Songs are performed preferably in a diphthong, the first and second voice which is a special secret performance of this music and some performers sing in troglasju as they do Kalesijski triple that was recorded in 1968, as the first written record of the tone on the album, along with Higurashi no naku.

Sports

Founded in 1927, the Workers Sports Society Sloboda became the first sporting organization in Tuzla. It has 14 member clubs. The city is home to two football clubs. FK Sloboda and FK Tuzla City. Both teams play in the top tier Premier League of Bosnia and Herzegovina with home games played at the Tušanj City Stadium.

OKK Sloboda basketball club and RK Sloboda handball club play their home games in the Mejdan Sports Arena which has a seating capacity of 4,900.

Jedinstvo Tuzla is the female counterpart to Sloboda. The women's basketball team Jedinstvo Aida won the FIBA Women's European Champions Cup, with the most famous sportswoman from Tuzla, Razija Mujanović. She was inducted to the FIBA Hall of Fame in 2017.

Miscellaneous
On 1 September 2007, 6,980 couples kissed for 10 seconds in Tuzla, erasing the previous Guinness World kissing Records of the Philippines and Hungary (for synchronised osculation in 2004 with 5,327 Filipino couples, overtaken by Hungary in 2005 with 5,875 couples; Filipinos came back in February 2010 with 6,124 couples but the Hungarians responded in June 2010 with 6,613 couples). The record now awaits official certification.

On 26 September 2008, Tuzla began offering free wireless internet access in the city center.

On 7 May 2010, Tuzla tried to break the World Record for the world's largest mass waltz dance. It is estimated that over 1,521 couples danced together on the main city square.

Transport

Tuzla has an international airport located at Dubrave (IATA code: TZL), and an effective and well-developed public bus network. There are plans to introduce a trolleybus network in the city soon.

The airport was opened and obtained ICAO certificate for civilian Air traffic in 2008. The airport had comprised a portion of "Eagle Base", an American military base that has been home to NATO troops serving in SFOR, Bosnia's stabilization force. Nowadays former Eagle Base become home of Bosnian Military Forces. In 2013. the airport became a base for Wizz Air. Tuzla International Airport nowadays has connection to 17+ European cities and expanding. More than 300000 passengers have been traveled via Tuzla International Airport in 2016.In 2017 Tuzla International Airport broke its own record for most passengers in one year with 535.596 passengers. While in 2018 that number again rose up to 584.471.

Tuzla has a railway station that has passenger services to Doboj, from where trains run to Sarajevo, Zagreb, and Belgrade. The services to Brčko were discontinued in 2012.

Tuzla is well connected with other major cities in Bosnia and Herzegovina and even with some European cities via its bus connections. Bus and taxi traffic is very well organised in Tuzla and is affordable to its citizens. Bus stations were built in 1970 and completely renovated and modernized in 2017.

Education 

Tuzla is home to the University of Tuzla, with 16,500 students, and also the American University in Bosnia and Herzegovina.

Universities
University of Tuzla
American University in Bosnia and Herzegovina

Schools
Association Citizens Educational Center
Behram-Begova Medresa Tuzla
Secondary Music School in Tuzla
Gimnazija Meša Selimović
Građevinsko-Geodetska Škola Tuzla
Katolički Školski Centar "Sv.Franjo" Tuzla
Ekonomsko-Trgovinska Škola Tuzla
Elektrotehnička Škola Tuzla
Medicinska Škola Tuzla
Mješovita Mašinska-Saobraćajna Škola Tuzla

Notable people
Alma Zadić, Austrian politician
Amer Delić, professional tennis player
Andrea Petković, German professional tennis player
Andreja Pejić, Australian model
Damir Mulaomerović, Croatian basketball player
Denis Azabagić, guitarist
Emir Hadžihafizbegović, actor
Emir Vildić, musician
Lepa Brena, singer
Maya Sar, singer
Meša Selimović, writer
Milan Đurić, footballer
Mirza Delibašić, basketball player, Olympic, World and European champion, FIBA Hall of Fame member
Miralem Pjanić, footballer
Miroslav Tadić, musician
Muhamed Hevaji Uskufi Bosnevi, writer, poet
Muhamed Hadžiefendić, commander of Hadžiefendić Legion
Muhamed Konjić, retired football player
Nesim Tahirović, painter
Jusuf Nurkić, basketball player for Portland Trail Blazers
Sanja Maletić, singer
Siniša Martinović, professional ice hockey player
Svetlana Dašić-Kitić, retired handball player, Voted World Player of the Year 1988 by the International Handball Federation
Zlatan Saračević, retired Olympic athlete, European Indoor Championships 1980 Sindelfingen gold winner – shot put.

Twin towns – sister cities

Tuzla is twinned with:

 Beşiktaş, Turkey
 Bologna, Italy
 L'Hospitalet de Llobregat, Spain
 Linz, Austria
 Osijek, Croatia
 Pécs, Hungary
 Saint-Denis, France
 Tuzla, Turkey

Gallery

Notes

References

External links

 
Tuzlanski Info Portal  local news website 

 
Populated places in Tuzla
Cities and towns in the Federation of Bosnia and Herzegovina